Angela Rosalind Runcie, Baroness Runcie (née Turner; 23 January 1932  12 January 2012) was a classical pianist and the wife of Robert Runcie, Archbishop of Canterbury.

Family and early life
Runcie's father was J. W. Cecil Turner, a Worcestershire county cricketer and a recipient of the Military Cross, who served as the bursar of Trinity Hall, Cambridge. She was educated at the Perse School for Girls, Cambridge and the London Guildhall School of Music.

She married Robert Runcie on 5 September 1957. They had two children, James (born 1959) and Rebecca Runcie (born 1962).

Later life
In 1974, Michael Ramsey, Archbishop of Canterbury, was scheduled to retire in November. His successor was to be appointed by Harold Wilson, Prime Minister of the United Kingdom. In April, Ladbrokes had already announced the betting odds as to who the next archbishop would be. Runcie, whose husband was at the time Bishop of St Albans and considered a likely candidate, was reported by Time magazine to have disapproved of the entire process: "It's revolting to turn important church affairs into a horse race." The archbishop appointed was Donald Coggan, Archbishop of York, whom Ladbrokes had considered a leading candidate. That same year Robert Runcie was offered the position which Coggan had vacated, that of the Archbishop of York. She was reportedly set against moving from St Albans, Hertfordshire to York, North Yorkshire, resulting in her husband turning down the offer. Robert Runcie was appointed Archbishop of Canterbury in 1979 and installed in the position in 1980. His acceptance of the position was reportedly delayed for weeks because of her alleged opposition to moving to Lambeth Palace.

Runcie continued to give piano recitals in both the United Kingdom and the United States. According to an article in the Wrexham Evening Leader in 1983, she had raised over £60,000 for charity through her recitals. She was interested in gardening and redesigned the gardens at Lambeth Palace (the London base of the Archbishop of Canterbury) in 1986.

During the 1980s, the Early Diagnostic Unit for breast cancer of The Royal Marsden NHS Foundation Trust was threatened with closure. Runcie and June Kenton, owner of the Rigby & Peller shop, which has received a Royal Warrant for custom-making the brassieres of Elizabeth II of the United Kingdom, organised a petition for its continued existence, gathering thousands of signatures. Their petition was delivered to Norman Fowler, Secretary of State for Work and Pensions, who withdrew the notice of closure.

In 1987, she was featured in articles of the Daily Star, a daily British tabloid newspaper. She took legal action against the publisher under English defamation law. The case reportedly concluded with a settlement in her favour. In 1988, she was named Honorary President of the Anglo-Armenian Association.

Later years and death
Runcie lived in St Albans (in which city she had lived in the 1970s during her husband's time as Bishop of St Albans) and taught piano privately and at St Albans School and St Albans High School for Girls.

Robert Runcie died on 11 July 2000. Lady Runcie died on 12 January 2012, 11 days before her 80th birthday.

References

Sources
 Carpenter, Humphrey, Robert Runcie: The Reluctant Archbishop. Hodder & Stoughton, 1996. .

External links
Profile on Peerage.com
Caslon Analytics defamation profile, listing Runcie's case against the Daily Star
Time article of 8 April 1974 mentioning a statement by Runcie

1932 births
2012 deaths
Alumni of the Guildhall School of Music and Drama
British baronesses
English classical pianists
English women pianists
People educated at the Perse School for Girls
Musicians from Cambridgeshire
Spouses of life peers
20th-century classical pianists
20th-century English musicians
20th-century English women musicians
20th-century women pianists